The Paraguay women's national volleyball team represents Paraguay in international volleyball competitions. In the 1960s the squad twice won a medal (silver and bronze) at the South American Championship. Paraguay also participated in the 1982 FIVB Women's World Championship in Lima, Peru.

Results

FIVB World Championship
 1982 — 19th place

South American Championship
 2009 — 8th place
 2011 — 7th place

See also
 Paraguay men's national volleyball team

References
Sports123

Volleyball
National women's volleyball teams
Volleyball in Paraguay